Bayt Dajan, also known as Dajūn, was a Palestinian Arab village situated approximately  southeast of Jaffa. It is thought to have been the site of the biblical town of Beth Dagon, mentioned in the Book of Joshua and in ancient Assyrian and Ancient Egyptian texts.

In the mid-16th century, Bayt Dajan formed part of an Ottoman waqf established by Roxelana, the wife of Suleiman the Magnificent, and by the late 16th century, it was part of the nahiya of Ramla in the liwa of Gaza. Villagers paid taxes to the Ottoman authorities for property and agricultural goods and animal husbandry conducted in the villages, including the cultivation of wheat, barley, fruit, and sesame, as well as on goats, beehives and vineyards. In the 19th Century, the village women were also locally renowned for the intricate, high quality embroidery designs, a ubiquitous feature of traditional Palestinian costumes.

By the time of the Mandatory Palestine, the village housed two elementary schools, a library and an agronomic school. After an assault by the Alexandroni Brigade during Operation Hametz on 25 April 1948 in the lead up to the 1948 Arab–Israeli war, the village was entirely depopulated. The Israeli town of Beit Dagan was founded at the same site in October 1948.

Another Bayt Dajan, not to be confused with this one, is located southeast of Nablus.

History

Iron Age
The village has a millennium-long history. It is mentioned in Assyrian and Ancient Egyptian texts as "Bīt Dagana" and bet dgn, respectively. Its Arabic name, Bayt Dajan, preserves its ancient name.

Beth Dagon appears in  among the list of "the uttermost cities of the tribe of the children of Judah toward the coast of Edom southward." It also appears in the Tosefta (Ohalot 3:4) transcribed as "Beth Dagan". Moshe Sharon writes that this latter spelling, which corresponds exactly to the Arabic name, may have arisen after the village was conquered by Judea. With Dagon being a head deity in the Philistine pantheon of gods, Sharon speculates that under Judean control, his name was changed to Dagan, meaning "wheat", a symbol of prosperity.

Byzantine era
Jerome describes the village in the 4th century CE as "very large", noting its name then as "Kafar Dagon" or "Caphardagon", situating it between Diospolis (modern Lod) and Yamnia (Yavne/Yibna). Bayt Dajan also appears on the 6th century Map of Madaba under the name [Bet]o Dagana.

Early Islamic era
The nearby site of Khirbet Dajūn, a tel with ruins to the southwest of Bayt Dajan, preserves the Dagon rather than Dagan spelling. In Arabic literature, there are many references to Dajūn, which was also used to refer to Bayt Dajan itself.

During his reign of 724–743 CE, the Umayyad caliph Hisham ibn Abd al-Malik built a palace in Bayt Dajan with white marble columns.

Arab geographer al-Muqaddasi mentions in the 10th century, a road in the Ramla area, darb dajūn, as connecting to the town of Dajūn which had a Friday mosque, and in a separate entry he adds that most of the town's inhabitants were Samaritans. By this time, one of the eight gates to the city of Ramla was also named "Dajūn".

In the 11th century, Bayt Dajan served as a headquarters for the Fatimid army in Palestine.

Crusader and Ayyubid eras
During the Crusader period, Richard the Lionheart built a small castle in the village in 1191. Known as Casal Maen (or Casal Moein), it "was the utmost limit of inland occupation allowed [to the Crusaders] by Saladin," and was destroyed by Saladin following the signing of the Treaty of Jaffa on 2 September 1192.

In 1226, during Ayyubid rule, Yaqut al-Hamawi writes that it was "one of the villages in the district of Ramla" and devotes the rest of his discussion of it to Ahmad al-Dajani, also known as Abu Bakr Muhammad, a renowned Muslim scholar who hailed from there.

Ottoman era
During early  Ottoman rule in Palestine, the revenues of the village of Bayt Dajan were in 1557 designated for the new waqf of Hasseki Sultan Imaret in Jerusalem, established by Hasseki Hurrem Sultan (Roxelana), the wife of Suleiman the Magnificent. In the 1596 tax records, Bayt Dajan was a village in the nahiya ("subdistrict") of Ramla, part of the Liwa of Gaza. It had a population of 115 Muslim households; an estimated 633 persons. The villagers paid taxes to the authorities for the crops that they cultivated, which included wheat, barley, fruit, and sesame as well as on other types of agricultural products, such as goats, beehives and vineyards; a total of 14,200 akçe. All of the revenue went to a waqf.

An Arabic inscription on marble dating to 1762 was found in Bayt Dajan. Held in the private collection of Moshe Dayan, Moshe Sharon identified it as a dedicatory inscription for a Sufi maqam for a popular Egyptian saint, Ibrahim al-Matbuli, who was buried in Isdud.  The village appeared as a village on the map of Pierre Jacotin compiled in  1799, though it was wrongly named as Qabab.

In 1838  Beit Dejan was among the villages  Edward Robinson noted from the top of the White Mosque, Ramla. It was further noted as a Muslim village, in the Lydda District.  A headstone, made of limestone with a poetic inscription in Arabic from Bayt Dajan, dating to 1842, was also in Dayan's private collection.

Socin found from an official Ottoman village list from about 1870  that  Bayt Dajan had  a population of 432, with a total of  184 houses, though the population count included men, only.  Hartmann found that  Bet Dedschan  had 148 houses.

In the late 19th century, Bayt Dajan was described as moderate-sized village surrounded by olive trees. Philip Baldensperger noted of Bayt Dajan in 1895 that:The inhabitants are very industrious, occupied chiefly in making mats and baskets for carrying earth and stones. They own camels for carrying loads from Jaffa to Jerusalem, cultivate the lands, and work at building etc., in Jaffa or on the railway works. The women flock every day to Jaffa and on Wednesday to Ramla—to the market held there, with chickens, eggs and milk.
In 1903, a cache of gold coins were found in Khirbet Dajun by villagers from Bayt Dajan, who used this site as a quarry. The discovery prompted R. A. Macalister to visit the site. Based on his observations detailed in a report for the Palestine Exploration Fund (PEF), Macalister suggests a continuity in settlement over the historical phases in Bayt Dajan's development :"Thus we have three epochs in the history of Beth-Dagon — the first on an as yet unknown site, from the Amorite to the Roman periods; the second at Dajiin, extending over the Roman and early Arab periods; the third at the modern Beit Dejan, lasting to the present day. It is probable that the present population could, had they the necessary documents, show a continuous chain of ancestry extending from the first city to the last."

British Mandate era
By the 20th century, the village had two elementary schools, one for boys, and one for girls. The school for boys was established during the British Mandate in Palestine in 1920. It housed a library of 600 books and had acquired 15 dunams of land that were used for instruction in agronomy.

In the 1922 census of Palestine,  Bait-Dajan had a population of 1,714 residents, all  Muslims increasing  the 1931 census to  2,664;  2,626 Muslims, 27 Christians and 11 Jews, in a total of  591 houses.

In 1934, when Fakhri al-Nashashibi established the Arab Workers Society (AWS) in Jerusalem, an AWS branch was also opened in Bayt Dajan. By 1940, 353 males and 102 females attended the schools.

In  the 1945 statistics   the population was 3,840; 130 Christians and 3,710 Muslims,  while the total land area was 17,327  dunams. Of this, a total of 7,990 dunams of land was used for citrus and banana cultivation, 676 dunams for cereals and 3,195 dunams were irrigated or used for orchards,  while 14 dunams were classified as built-up areas.

1948 Palestine War

The village of Bayt Dajan was depopulated in the weeks leading up to the 1948 Arab–Israeli war, during the Haganah's offensive Mivtza Hametz (Operation Hametz) on 28–30 April 1948. This operation was held against a group of villages east of Jaffa, including Bayt Dajan. According to the preparatory orders, the objective was to "opening the way [for Jewish forces] to Lydda". Though there was no explicit mention of the prospective treatment of the villagers, the order spoke of "cleansing the area" [tihur hashetah]. The final operational order stated: "Civilian inhabitants of places conquered would be permitted to leave after they are searched for weapons." On the 30 April, it was reported that the inhabitants of the Bayt Dajan had left, and that Iraqi irregulars had moved into the village.

Bayt Dajan was one of at least eight villages destroyed by Israel's First Transfer Committee between June and July 1948 under the leadership of Joseph Weitz. On 16 June 1948, David Ben-Gurion, almost certainly based on a progress report from Weitz, noted Bayt Dajan as one of the Palestinian villages that they had destroyed. On 23 September 1948 General Avner named Bayt Dajan as a suitable village for resettlement for new Jewish immigrants (olim) to Israel.

Israel
Following the war the area was incorporated into the State of Israel. Four villages, Beit Dagan (established six months after the conquest), Mishmar HaShiv'a (1949), Hemed (1950) and Ganot (1953) were later established on land that had belonged to the Bayt Dajan.

The Palestinian historian Walid Khalidi described the village in 1992: "A number of houses remain; some are deserted, others are occupied by Jewish families, or used as stores, office buildings, or warehouses. They exhibit a variety of architectural features. One inhabited house is made of concrete and has a rectangular plan, a flat roof, rectangular front windows, and two arched side windows. Another has been converted into the Eli Cohen synagogue; it is made of concrete and has a flat roof and a round-arched front door and window. Stars of David have been painted on its front door and what appears to be a garage door. One of the deserted houses is made of concrete and has a gabled, tiled roof that is starting to collapse; others are sealed and stand amid shrubs and weeds. Cactuses and cypress, fig, and date palm trees grow on the site. The land in the vicinity is cultivated by Israelis."

Demographics
During early Ottoman rule in 1596, there were 633 inhabitants in Bayt Dajan. In the 1922 British Mandate census, the village had 1,714 residents, rising to 2,664 in 1931. There were 591 houses in the latter year. Sami Hadawi counted a population of 3,840 Arab inhabitants in his 1945 land and population survey. From the 4th century CE to the 10th century, Samaritans populated Bayt Dajan. In 1945, Most of the inhabitants were Muslims, but a Christian community of 130 also existed in the village. Palestinian refugees amounted to 27,355 people in 1998.

Culture

Bayt Dajan was known to be among the wealthiest communities in the Jaffa area, and their embroideresses were reported to be among the most artistic. A center for weaving and embroidery, it exerted influences on many other surrounding villages and towns. Costumes from Beit Dajan were noted for their varied techniques, many of which were adopted and elaborated from other local styles.

White linen garments inspired by Ramallah styles were popular, using patchwork and appliqued sequins in addition to embroidery. A key motif was the nafnuf design: a floral pattern thought to be inspired by the locally grown orange trees. The nafnuf design evolved after World War I into embroidery running down the dress in long panels known as "branches" (erq). This erq style was the forerunner of the "6 branch" style dresses worn by Palestinian women in different regions today. In the 1920s, a lady from Bethlehem named Maneh Hazbun came to live in Bayt Dajan after her brother bought some orange groves there. She introduced the rashek (couching with silk) style of embroidery, a local imitation of the Bethlehem style.

The jillayeh (the embroidered outer garment for wedding costume) used in Bayt Dajan was quite similar to those of Ramallah. The difference was in decoration and embroidery. Typical for Bayt Dajan would be a motif consisting of two triangles, mirror-faced, with or without an embroidered stripe between them, and with inverted cypresses at the edges. A jillayeh from Bayt Dajan (c. 1920s) is exhibited at the British Museum. The caption notes that the dress would be worn by the bride at the final ritual of wedding week celebrations, a procession known as 'going to the well'. Accompanied by all the village women in their finest dress, the bride would go to the well to present a tray of sweets to the guardian of the well and fill her pitcher with water to ensure good fortune for her home. There are also several items from Bayt Dajan and the surrounding area is in the Museum of International Folk Art (MOIFA) collection at Santa Fe, United States.

Artistic representations
Palestinian artist Sliman Mansour made Bayt Dajan the subject of one of his paintings. The work, named for the village, was one of a series of four on destroyed Palestinian villages that he produced in 1988; the others being Yalo, Imwas and Yibna.

See also
Depopulated Palestinian locations in Israel
List of villages depopulated during the Arab–Israeli conflict
Sakher Habash

References

Bibliography

 

  

  

 

 

 

 

 (Bayt Dajan pp. 89–93)
 

 

 Exhibition catalog; see also chapters five and six (p. 203–270) on "Changing Fashions in Beit Dajan" and "Wedding Rituals in Beit Dajan".

Further reading
Widad Kawar/Shelagh Weir: Costumes and Wedding Customs in Bayt Dajan

External links
Palestine Remembered – Bayt Dajan
Bayt Dajan,   Zochrot
Bayt Dajan, palestine-family.net
Survey of Western Palestine, Map 13: IAA,  Wikimedia commons
Coat dress, in British Museum
Black Beit Dajan dress, with a rare embroidered scarf
Detail of a sleeve from a Beit Dajan thob al-abayed, 1920s–30s (Tareq Rajab Museum, Kuwait)
Beit-Dajan dress, together with costumes from Safryieh and Asdoud
Thob of Beit Dajan (Jaffa District). This "thob" is rich in embroidery, main colour is red touched with lilac and green. It has "manajel" on the sides, and is worn with a belt.
A Book about Beit Dajan - Jaffa (Pre-release), لكي لا ننسى ... بيت دجن, by Ayman J. Hammoudeh, MD, FACC

Arab villages depopulated prior to the 1948 Arab–Israeli War
District of Jaffa